"Sorry's Not Good Enough" / "Friday Night" is the third single taken from British pop rock band McFly's third studio album, Motion in the Ocean. The single was released on 18 December 2006, peaking at  3 on the UK Singles Chart after entering the chart at No. 98 on download sales alone. "Friday Night" is the main theme for the film Night at the Museum (2006), appearing on both the soundtrack and in the movie itself. Videos for both tracks were recorded, with the video for "Sorry's Not Good Enough" appearing on the DVD single, and the video for "Friday Night" appearing on the DVD release of Night at the Museum.

Music videos

"Sorry's Not Good Enough"
During the video, Tom is seen eating a meal with a girl (Sai Bennett) while the rest of the band play the song. As the video progresses, it is revealed that the restaurant in which the couple eat is actually just a set up and that the girl has her wrists fastened to the table with duct tape and her legs tied to the chair with duct tape leaving her unable to leave Tom. Then a video about the happy times when the two were together is projected on the wall. Tom takes the girl's hand and she starts to cry, but secretly manages to pull off the tape. When the video stops, she stands up and opens her arms, like she wants to hug Tom. But when he comes over to her, she kicks him and leaves the room.

"Friday Night"
"Friday Night" is featured in the movie Night at the Museum starring Ben Stiller, Robin Williams,  and British comedians Ricky Gervais and Steve Coogan. It was released in North America on 22 December 2006, and in UK cinemas on Boxing Day, 26 December 2006. The video, shot with various handheld cameras, features the band members as security guards at the British Museum of Natural History, and then running around London.

Track listings
UK CD single
 "Sorry's Not Good Enough"
 "Friday Night"
 "Rockin' Robin"
 "Sorry's Not Good Enough" (live version)
 "Sorry's Not Good Enough" (live video)
 A sticker on the front of the case labels this as CD1; however, there is no CD2. The paper inlay sleeve confirms there is only one CD, as instead of having 'CD1'/'CD2' written on the spine like other McFly releases, it simply has 'CD'.

UK DVD single
 "Sorry's Not Good Enough" (audio)
 "Friday Night" (audio)
 "Motion in the Ocean Tour Movie"
 "Sorry's Not Good Enough" (video)
 "Album Launch Party" (video)

Charts

Weekly charts

Year-end charts

References

McFly songs
2006 singles
Island Records singles
Songs written by Danny Jones
Songs written by Dougie Poynter
Songs written by Jason Perry (singer)
Songs written by Tom Fletcher
Universal Records singles